Vartini is a tribe of leafhoppers in the subfamily Deltocephalinae. It currently contains 7 genera and over 20 species. Phylogenetic studies have shown that Vartini is closely related to Punctulini.

Genera 
There are 7 described genera in Vartini:

References 

Deltocephalinae